Rat Rock may refer to

 Rat Rock (California)
 Rat Rock (Central Park)
 Rat Rock (Morningside Heights)